The Jordan national football team represents Jordan in international football and is controlled by the Jordan Football Association. Jordan have never qualified for the World Cup finals but have appeared four times in the Asian Cup and reached its quarter-final stage in the 2004 and 2011 editions.

Jordan is a two-time champion of the Pan Arab Games, 1997 and 1999 editions of the tournament, champion of the Jordan International Tournament, 1992, 2022, and champion of the Bahrain International Tournament, 2002. So far, Jordan has hosted the West Asian Football Federation Championship three times in (2000, 2007 and 2010), the Arab Cup once in 1988 and the Pan Arab Games once in 1999.

History
The Jordanian national football team's first international match was played in 1953 in Egypt where the team were defeated by Syria 3–1. The first FIFA World Cup Qualifiers Jordan took part in was the 1986 qualifiers, they are yet to qualify for a World Cup. For the first time in their history, Jordan have qualified for the final round of the FIFA World Cup qualifiers in the 2014 World Cup qualification campaign.   
 
The first (Jordanian) football coach, Mohammad Awad, to attain achievements for the Jordan national team between 1992 and 1999 when he first helped his country Jordan win the Jordan International tournament of 1992 and both tournaments of the Pan Arab Games, starting in 1997 in Beirut, and 1999 in Amman.

The Jordan national football team had begun making more improvements under the Serbian head coach Branko Smiljanić who had helped Jordan attain greater match results in the first round of the 2002 World Cup qualifiers but failed to help Jordan qualify for the next round. Brapanko also helped Jordan reach the semifinals of the 2002 Arab Cup and got Jordan to win the fourth place in the 2000 West Asian Football Federation Championship and the second place in the 2004 edition in Syria but failed to help Jordan win these tournaments. After he resigned from coaching Jordan, the Egyptian Mahmoud El-Gohary agreed to take Branko's place as head coach.   
Under the leadership of El-Gohary, the Jordan national team was able to qualify for their first AFC Asian Cup tournament, in China 2004, and helped Jordan reach the quarter-finals of the tournament but failed to qualify for the semi-finals after losing to Japan in a penalty shoot-out after the match had ended with extra time in a 1–1 draw. But thanks to El-Gohary, the Jordan team reached its highest FIFA world ranking which was the 37th place in 2004. Just like Serbian Branko, El-Gohary also helped Jordan achieve greater match results in FIFA World Cup qualifications for 2006 in Jordan's first round but also failed to help Jordan qualify. In the WAFF championship tournaments of 2004 and 2007, El-Gohary helped Jordan win the third place in 2004 and helped Jordan reach the semi-finals in 2007. After coaching Jordan for five out of six matches in the 2007 Asian Cup qualifiers, El-Gohary retired as a football coach, the Portuguese Nelo Vingada took over as head coach of Jordan but was not able to help Jordan qualify for the 2007 Asian Cup. 
 
Another opportunity to show Vingada's worthiness as head coach came in the 2010 FIFA World Cup qualification campaign. But after failing to help Jordan qualify for the 2010 World Cup, Vingada was able to help Jordan win second place in the 2008 West Asian Football Federation Championship. Next up were the 2011 AFC Asian Cup qualification matches starting from January 2009. After getting off to a start by not winning the first two matches of the six, he was sacked by the Jordan Football Association and replaced by the Iraqi Adnan Hamad, a coach in Asia known for his successes with his national team Iraq as head coach as well as Iraq U-23 and other Iraq youth teams and clubs. His first experiences with Jordanian football players took place as he was coaching Jordanian football club Al-Faisaly from 2006 to 2008 and achieved specific results with that team as well.      
 
After helping Jordan qualify for their second Asian Cup tournament, Qatar 2011, Hamad began shouting 'Allahu Akbar' for the Jordan national team in September 2010 when they had the 2010 West Asian Football Federation Championship hosted in the country of Jordan. Hamad prepared for that tournament with a couple of friendlies as well as three more to prepare for the Asian Cup tournament in Qatar. Just like Mahmoud El-Gohary, Hamad also helped Jordan qualify for the quarterfinals in the Asian Cup but failed to progress to the semi-finals as they were defeated by Uzbekistan 2–1. Hamad was also got Jordan to win second place in the 2011 Pan Arab Games in Qatar. Hamad helped Jordan finish third in the final round of Asian group qualifying for the 2014 World Cup. He was replaced ahead of the final stages by the Egyptian Hossam Hassan to lead them to the play-off round against Uzbekistan to determine the AFC participant in the intercontinental play-off. The games took place on 6 and 10 September 2013. With the two teams still evenly matched at full-time in the second leg, Jordan eventually progressed to the intercontinental playoff after winning 9–8 on penalties. The Jordanians missed their very first FIFA World Cup debut after losing 5–0 against the Uruguayan team, after the goalless draw from the second leg. Hassan also helped Jordan to qualify to the 2015 Asian Cup. On 3 September 2014, Ray Wilkins was appointed as the new head coach of Jordan. He led Jordan at the 2015 Asian Cup where they were eliminated in group-stages for the first time after two losses against Iraq and Japan and a win over Palestine.

Jordan's performance remained in certain stagnation when the Jordanian Chivalrous could not make it to the final round of the 2018 FIFA World Cup qualification, losing 0–1 to Kyrgyzstan and 1–5 to Australia. After that, Jordan would qualify for 2019 Asian Cup where Jordan at the group stage defeated Australia and Syria to become the first team to reach the round of sixteen; but they were stunned by Vietnam after penalty shootout 2–4.

Team image

Home stadiums
The Jordan national football team has two home stadiums, the Amman International Stadium and the King Abdullah II Stadium. 
The Amman International Stadium was built in 1964 in Amman and opened in 1968. It is the largest stadium in Jordan, it is owned by the Jordanian government and operated by the higher council of youth. It is not only the home stadium of the Jordan national football team but for Al-Faisaly as well. It has a current capacity of 17,619 spectators.
Some 12 kilometres away from Amman International Stadium lies The King Abdullah II Stadium. It was built and opened in 1998 in Amman. It has a current capacity of 13,000 spectators. It is not only the home stadium of the Jordan national football team but for Al-Wehdat as well.
In addition to Jordan home games, the stadiums also host other major games in Jordanian football including Jordanian Pro League, Jordan FA Cup, Jordan FA Shield and Jordan Super Cup games, in addition to hosting other tournaments such as the 1988 Arab Cup, 1996 Arab Cup Winners' Cup, 1999 Pan Arab Games, 2003 Arab Athletics Championships, 2005 WAFF Women's Championship, 2007 Arab Athletics Championships, 2007 WAFF Women's Championship, 2007 WAFF Championship, 2006–07 Arab Champions League Finals, 2007 AFC Cup Finals, 2007 Asian Athletics Championships, 2010 WAFF Championship and 2016 FIFA U-17 Women's World Cup amongst others.

Kit sponsorship

Results and fixtures

The following matches were played or are scheduled to be played by the national team in the past or in the upcoming 12 months.

2022

2023

Coaching staff

Coaching history

 Shehadeh Mousa (1963–64)
 Miklós Vadas (1966–67)
 George Skinner (1968–69)
 Shehadeh Mousa (1971–72)
 Mohammad Awad (1972–75, 1985–86, 1997–98, 1998–2000)
 Josef Steiger (1975–76)
 Danny McLennan (1978–80)
 Mudhar Al-Saeed (1981)
 Tony Banfield (1983, 1989)
 Edson Tavares (1986–87)
 Slobodan Ogsananovic (1988–89)
 Ezzat Hamza (1992, 1995)
 Aleksandr Maksimenkov (1992–93)
 Vukašin Višnjevac (1998)
 Branko Smiljanić (2001–2002)
 Mahmoud El-Gohary (2002–07)
 Nelo Vingada (2007–09)
 Adnan Hamad (2009–13)
 Hossam Hassan (2013–14)
 Ahmed Abdel-Qader (2014, 2015)
 Ray Wilkins (2014–15)
 Paul Put (2015 – January 2016)
 Abdullah Abu Zema (January 2016 – March 2016, March 2016 – December 2016)
 Harry Redknapp (March 2016)
 Abdullah Mesfer (December 2016 – October 2017)
 Jamal Abu-Abed (October 2017 – September 2018)
 Vital Borkelmans (September 2018 – June 2021 )
 Adnan Hamad (June 2021 – )

Players

Current squad
The following players were selected for the friendly match against Spain on 17 November 2022.

Caps and goals correct as of 17 November 2022, following match versus Spain.

Recent call-ups 
The following players have been called up for the team within the last 12 months and are still available for selection.

 

Notes
INJ = It is not part of the current squad due to injury.
PRE = Preliminary squad.
WD = Player withdrew from the current squad due to non-injury issue. -->

Past squads

AFC Asian Cup
 2004 AFC Asian Cup
 2011 AFC Asian Cup
 2015 AFC Asian Cup
 2019 AFC Asian Cup

Player records

These lists include games and goals in competitions that are not recognised as full A-internationals by FIFA, but they are official for the Jordan FA.
Players in bold are still active at international  level.

Most capped players

Top goalscorers 

{| class="wikitable sortable" style="text-align:center;"
|-
!width=30px|Rank
! style="width:150px;"|Name
!width=50px|Goals
!width=50px|Caps
!width=50px|Ratio
! style="width:100px;"|Career
|-
|1
|align=left|Hamza Al-Dardour
|32
|93
|
|2011–present
|-
|2
|align=left|Hassan Abdel-Fattah
|30
|88
|
|2004–2015
|-
|3
|align=left|Abdallah Deeb
|25
|121
|
|2007–2016
|-
|rowspan=3|4
|align=left|Badran Al-Shaqran
|rowspan=3|21
|49
|
|1997–2006
|-
|align=left|Mahmoud Shelbaieh
|79
|
|2000–2011
|-
|align=left|Amer Deeb
|131
|
|2002–2014
|-
|7
|align=left|Mo'ayyad Salim
|19
|58
|
|1999–2006
|-
|8
|align=left|Ahmad Hayel
|18
|69
|
|2005–2015
|-
|9
|align=left|Baha Faisal
|17
|55
|
|2017-present
|-
|10
|align=left|Odai Al-Saify|15
|120
|
|2007–present
|}

Competitive record

FIFA World Cup

AFC Asian Cup

*Denotes draws include knockout matches decided via penalty shoot-out.

West Asian Championship

FIFA Arab Cup

Pan Arab Games

Asian Games

Palestine Cup of Nations

Head-to-head record

The following table shows Jordan's all-time international record''', after match against .

See also
 Jordan national under-23 football team
 Jordan national under-20 football team 
 Jordan national under-17 football team 
 Jordan women's national football team

References

External links

Jordan at FIFA.com
Jordan Football Federation Official Website
Jordan national football team on kooora.com
Jordan national football team on soccerway.com
Jordan national football team on futbol24.com

 
Asian national association football teams
National sports teams established in 1953